Jodie Leigh Brett (born  9 March 1996, Portsmouth) is an English former footballer who played in midfield for Brighton & Hove Albion, and the England Under 19 team.

Early life 
Born in Portsmouth, Brett was introduced to football at an early age by her father, who took her to Portsmouth matches as a season ticket holder. She began playing football at a young age and spent time in both the Portsmouth and Southampton youth set-ups before moving to the Chelsea centre of excellence at the age of nine.

Playing career

Club

Chelsea
As a member of Chelsea Centre of Excellence Under 17's, Brett was part of the team that won the League and FA Cup in May 2012. Through the course of her time with the Chelsea first team, Brett would see intermittent playing time making 16 appearances in 3 season and scoring twice.

Bristol City
Looking for more playing time, Brett joined Bristol City on a long-term loan from Chelsea ahead of the 2016 season.  Brett would register 20 appearances and scoring 3 goals contributing to Bristol's promotion to FA WSL 1. The loan-deal was subsequently extended through the 2017 Spring Series.

Everton
In July 2017, Brett transferred to Everton on a two-year deal.

Brighton & Hove Albion 
On 26th July 2018, aged 22, Brett signed for Albion for an undisclosed fee.

Early into the 2018-19 season, Brett suffered a severe foot injury which required specialist operative treatment. The procedure was not successful.

Brett underwent subsequent remedial operations which precluded her participation in the 2019-20 and 2020-21 seasons.

On 29th May 2021, at the age of 25, Brett announced her retirement from professional football due to injury.

International
She was involved with the English selections as captain in the 2015 UEFA Women's Under-19 Championship organized in Israel. Brett was named in UEFA's team of the tournament.

References

External links 
 
Jodie Brett at Everton Football Club
Verified Twitter Account @JodieBrett7 

1996 births
Living people
Footballers from Portsmouth
Chelsea F.C. Women players
Bristol City W.F.C. players
Everton F.C. (women) players
Women's Super League players
English women's footballers
Women's association football midfielders
England women's under-23 international footballers
Brighton & Hove Albion W.F.C. players